Asp may refer to:

Places
 Asp, part of Densbüren, Aargau, Switzerland
 Aspe (Asp in Valencian), Alicante, Spain
 Asp Lake, a lake in Minnesota

Animals 
 Asp (fish)
 Asp (snake), in antiquity, one of several venomous snakes
 Cerastes cerastes, a viper found in the Sahara desert
 Cerastes vipera, a viper found in the Sahara desert
 Egyptian cobra, a venomous snake found in North Africa and parts of the Middle East
 Vipera aspis, a viper found in Europe

 Megalopyge opercularis, asp caterpillar or tree asp, a venomous caterpillar

People 
 Nathan Aspinall, nicknamed "The Asp", English darts player
 Ninnie Asp (born 1950), Swedish silversmith

Other uses 
 Aspartic acid, an amino acid, which is abbreviated as "Asp"
 Aspasia (plant), an orchid genus, abbreviated "Asp."
 Asp (comics), snake-themed supervillain
 Asp (rocket), a sounding rocket

See also
 Aspe (disambiguation)
 ASPS (disambiguation)
 ASP (disambiguation)

Animal common name disambiguation pages